Pandanus petersii is a species of plant in the family Pandanaceae. It is endemic to Mozambique; its habitat ranges from Namacurra to Quelimane and the Zambezi Delta. Typical features of its habitat are woodland remnants in swampy or wetland places. It is threatened by habitat loss.

References

Flora of Mozambique
petersii
Vulnerable plants
Endemic flora of Mozambique
Taxonomy articles created by Polbot